Qeshlaq-e Jitu Rural District is in the Central District of Qarchak County, Tehran province, Iran. At the National Census of 2006, its population (as a part of the former Qarchak District of Varamin County) was 10,687 in 2,512 households. There were 10,726 inhabitants in 2,844 households at the following census of 2011. At the most recent census of 2016, the population of the rural district was 11,624 in 3,241 households, by which time the district had been separated from the county and Qarchak County established. The largest of its two villages was Qeshlaq-e Jitu, with 7,909 people.

References 

Qarchak County

Rural Districts of Tehran Province

Populated places in Tehran Province

Populated places in Qarchak County